In enzymology, a N-benzoyl-4-hydroxyanthranilate 4-O-methyltransferase is an enzyme that catalyzes the chemical reaction

S-adenosyl-L-methionine + N-benzoyl-4-hydroxyanthranilate  S-adenosyl-L-homocysteine + N-benzoyl-4-methoxyanthranilate

Thus, the two substrates of this enzyme are S-adenosyl methionine and N-benzoyl-4-hydroxyanthranilate, whereas its two products are S-adenosylhomocysteine and N-benzoyl-4-methoxyanthranilate.

This enzyme belongs to the family of transferases, specifically those transferring one-carbon group methyltransferases.  The systematic name of this enzyme class is S-adenosyl-L-methionine:N-benzoyl-4-O-hydroxyanthranilate 4-O-methyltransferase. Other names in common use include N-benzoyl-4-hydroxyanthranilate 4-methyltransferase, and benzoyl-CoA:anthranilate N-benzoyltransferase.

References

 

EC 2.1.1
Enzymes of unknown structure